Salvatore Cabella (21 October 1896 – 11 May 1965) was an Italian water polo player. He competed in the men's tournament at the 1920 Summer Olympics.

See also
 Italy men's Olympic water polo team records and statistics
 List of men's Olympic water polo tournament goalkeepers

References

External links
 

1896 births
1965 deaths
Italian male water polo players
Water polo goalkeepers
Olympic water polo players of Italy
Water polo players at the 1920 Summer Olympics
Water polo players from Genoa
People from Sampierdarena